Lin Ching-hsuan (born 14 May 1992 in Taoyuan) is a Taiwanese long jumper. He competed in the long jump event at the 2012 Summer Olympics. He represented his country at the 2010 Asian Games, 2011 Asian Athletics Championships, and the 2011 World Championships in Athletics.

At age category level, he was a long jump finalist at the 2009 World Youth Championships in Athletics and the 2010 World Junior Championships in Athletics, placing seventh at the latter competition. He won his first international medal, a gold, at the 2010 Asian Junior Athletics Championships.

References

1992 births
Living people
People from Taoyuan District
Taiwanese male long jumpers
Olympic athletes of Taiwan
Athletes (track and field) at the 2012 Summer Olympics
Athletes (track and field) at the 2010 Asian Games
World Athletics Championships athletes for Chinese Taipei
Asian Games competitors for Chinese Taipei
Sportspeople from Taoyuan City